Ben Donnell may refer to:
 Ben Donnell (American football)
 Ben Donnell (rugby union)